The 1993–94 BHL season was the 12th season of the British Hockey League, the top level of ice hockey in Great Britain. 12 teams participated in the league, and the Cardiff Devils won the league title by finishing first in the regular season. They also won the playoff championship.

Regular season

Playoffs

Group A

Group B

Semifinals
Cardiff Devils 9-5 Fife Flyers
Sheffield Steelers 8-0 Nottingham Panthers

Final
Cardiff Devils 12-1 Sheffield Steelers

References

External links
Season on hockeyarchives.info

1993–94 in British ice hockey
United
British Hockey League seasons